Ashleigh Riddell (born 7 March 1996) is an Australian rules footballer playing for the North Melbourne Football Club in the AFL Women's (AFLW) competition. Riddell is a dual AFL Women's All-Australian and won the North Melbourne best and fairest award in 2022.

Early life
Riddell played junior football in Melbourne's north-east for the Eltham Panthers, crossing to basketball as a teenager due to "a greater long-term pathway". Following the AFL's decision to launch a new women's competition, she returned to football in 2016, playing for Fitzroy in the third division of the now-defunct Victorian Women's Football League (VWFL). Riddell then joined  in 2017 and was selected in the VFL Women's (VFLW) Team of the Year. She was invited to the first AFLW Draft Combine, but her rapid rise in the sport stalled when she was passed over at the 2017 AFL Women's draft.

With Diamond Creek not holding a VFLW licence for 2018, Riddell was persuaded by coach Scott Gowans to move to North Melbourne's affiliate women's team, . She was appointed captain in her first season at the club and was again named in the VFLW Team of the Year.

AFL Women's career

Riddell was signed by North Melbourne as a free agent during the expansion club signing period of the 2018 AFL Women's draft. Her season was cut short due to an ankle injury sustained the following week in North Melbourne's win over  when opponent Nicola Barr made an illegal shepherd behind play; Barr received a one-match suspension as a result.

Riddell was named in the 2020 AFL Women's All-Australian team after a standout season in which she led the competition for kicks. Leading into the 2021 season, womens.afl journalist Sarah Black named Riddell at no. 17 on her list of the top 30 players in the AFLW. She had another strong season in 2021, finishing third in her club's best and fairest count for the second consecutive year. At the end of the season, she re-signed with North Melbourne for two more seasons.

Riddell was named at no. 14 in Sarah Black's 2022 list of the top 30 players in the AFLW. At the halfway point of the season, Riddell led the competition for disposals with 139, at an average of 27.9 a game. She was named in Champion Data's 2022 AFLW All-Star stats team after leading the competition for disposals with 29.9 a game, recording at least 30 disposals in six games. Riddell was North Melbourne's best player in its qualifying final loss to Fremantle.

Despite reports of a "big offer" to join expansion club Sydney, Riddell re-signed with North Melbourne in June 2022 for a further two seasons.

Statistics
Updated to the end of S7 (2022).

|-
| 2019 ||  || 7
| 2 || 1 || 1 || 20 || 6 || 26 || 3 || 9 || 0.5 || 0.5 || 10.0 || 3.0 || 13.0 || 1.5 || 4.5 || 2
|-
| 2020 ||  || 7
| 7 || 1 || 4 || bgcolor=CAE1FF | 112† || 37 || 149 || 23 || 32 || 0.1 || 0.6 || bgcolor=CAE1FF | 16.0† || 5.3 || 21.3 || 3.3 || 4.6 || 1
|-
| 2021 ||  || 7
| 10 || 3 || 5 || 141 || 77 || 218 || 32 || 45 || 0.3 || 0.5 || 14.1 || 7.7 || 21.8 || 3.2 || 4.5 || 10
|-
| 2022 ||  || 7
| 11 || 0 || 4 || 191 || bgcolor=CAE1FF | 131† || bgcolor=CAE1FF | 322† || 41 || 44 || 0.0 || 0.4 || bgcolor=CAE1FF | 17.4† || 11.9 || bgcolor=CAE1FF | 29.3† || 3.7 || 4.0 || 17
|-
| S7 (2022) ||  || 7
| 13 || 1 || 4 || 199 || 90 || 289 || 37 || 53 || 0.1 || 0.3 || 15.3 || 6.9 || 22.2 || 2.8 || 4.1 || 7
|- class=sortbottom
! colspan=3 | Career
! 43 !! 6 !! 18 !! 663 !! 341 !! 1004 !! 136 !! 182 !! 0.1 !! 0.4 !! 15.4 !! 7.9 !! 23.3 !! 3.2 !! 4.2 !! 37
|}

Honours and achievements
 2× AFL Women's All-Australian team: 2020, 2022
 North Melbourne best and fairest: 2022

References

External links

 
 
 

1996 births
Living people
North Melbourne Football Club (AFLW) players
Australian rules footballers from Victoria (Australia)
Melbourne University Football Club (VFLW) players